Salai Lian Luai, a lawyer turned politician who served as Chief Minister of Chin State, the head of Chin State Government. He received a law degree from Yangon University.

He served as a lawyer for various government offices in Yangon, Mandalay and Sagaing regions, as well as in Chin State. In his last role as a civil servant, he worked as a Tamu District legal officer.

Political career 
In the 2015 election, he contested and won the No 2 spot for Falam Township in the State Hluttaw as a new member of the National League for Democracy.

In the wake of the 2021 Myanmar coup d'état on 1 February, he was detained by the Myanmar Armed Forces. Now s/he is in India

Personal life 
Salai is an ethnic Chin and practicing Baptist. Luai took shelter in Mizoram following the military coup in Myanmar.

References 

Living people
Government ministers of Myanmar
National League for Democracy politicians
People from Chin State
Burmese people of Chin descent
Burmese Baptists
21st-century Burmese lawyers
Year of birth missing (living people)